Critical Mass is a pressure group which began its days in opposition to the government of Margaret Thatcher.  It supported the National Union of Mineworkers (NUM). Critical Mass was founded in 1984 in Ramsgate as a result of regulations that prevented local inhabitants out of work from living in the then-numerous empty hotels desperate for trade.

References
 Red Herrings (1985), a BBC documentary broadcast on BBC2.

Political advocacy groups in the United Kingdom